Chvojnica is a village and municipality in Prievidza District in the Trenčín Region of western Slovakia.

History
In historical records the village was first mentioned in 1614.

Geography
The municipality lies at an altitude of 493 metres and covers an area of 9.298 km2. It has a population of about 235 people.

See also
 List of municipalities and towns in Slovakia

Genealogical resources

The records for genealogical research are available at the state archive "Statny Archiv in Nitra, Slovakia"

 Roman Catholic church records (births/marriages/deaths): 1679-1903 (parish B)

References

External links
 
 
https://web.archive.org/web/20071217080336/http://www.statistics.sk/mosmis/eng/run.html
Surnames of living people in Chvojnica

Villages and municipalities in Prievidza District